Zimbabwe Cricket (ZC), previously known as the Zimbabwe Cricket Union (ZCU) until 2004, is the governing body for the sport of cricket in Zimbabwe. Zimbabwe Cricket is a full member of the International Cricket Council (ICC), and administers the Zimbabwe national cricket team, organising Test tours, One-Day Internationals and Twenty20 Internationals with other nations. It also organises domestic cricket, including the Castle Logan Cup, the Coca-Cola Metbank Pro50 Championship and the Stanbic Bank 20 Series in Zimbabwe.

In July 2019, the ICC suspended Zimbabwe Cricket, with the team barred from taking part in ICC events, which put their participation in the 2019 ICC Women's World Twenty20 Qualifier and the 2019 ICC T20 World Cup Qualifier tournaments in doubt. Later the same month, the ICC wrote to Zimbabwe Cricket, instructing them to reinstate their board that was elected on 14 June 2019, or risk the termination of their ICC membership. In October 2019, the ICC lifted its suspension on Zimbabwe Cricket, allowing them to take part in future ICC events.

In December 2022, ZC announced a six-team T10 tournament which is set to launch in March 2023. It will be called Zim Afro T10. The tournament is the first ever franchise league of the board.

History

Zimbabwe cricket went through major upheaval during the 2000s. During the 2003 Cricket World Cup, senior team members Andy Flower and Henry Olonga staged their "black armband protest" at the "death of democracy" in Zimbabwe, a reference to the country's political situation. Both players subsequently retired from international cricket. In 2004, the majority of the remaining senior players quit the international game following a player protest triggered by the removal of then-captain Heath Streak, resulting in a very young and inexperienced side being fielded in subsequent series against Sri Lanka and Australia. Zimbabwe's resounding defeats in those series led to the withdrawal of Test status that, apart from a brief resumption in 2005 with series against South Africa, New Zealand and India, remained in place until early 2011. Recent improvements in Zimbabwe's on-field performances, including a notable victory over Australia in the 2007 ICC World Twenty20 group stages and an overhaul of coaching staff has, however, led to the side's Test status being reinstated, with matches now planned against Bangladesh, Pakistan and New Zealand in late 2011.

In February 2017, Zimbabwe Cricket confirmed that an academy side would tour England later that year to play fixtures against second XI sides, including Northamptonshire and Worcestershire. The following players were selected for the squad: Ryan Burl, Tinashe Kamunhukamwe, Taffy Mupariwa, Tafadzwa Tsiga, Tarisai Musakanda, Tylor Trenoweth, William Mashinge, Faraz Akram, Carl Mumba, Blessing Muzarabani, Tendai Nyamayaro, Mkhululi Nyathi, Richard Ngarava, Kuziva Ziwira, Thamsanqa Nunu and Brandon Mavuta.

In September 2018, the former national team coach Heath Streak submitted an application to the court to have Zimbabwe Cricket liquidated, in relation to outstanding debts.

Return to Test cricket

As part of the lead-up to their Test return, Zimbabwe Cricket announced major upgrades to the Harare Sports Club and Mutare Sports Club grounds. Plans for a new Test ground at Victoria Falls were also revealed. ZC also signed a three-year deal with Reebok worth $1mn. The deal will see Reebok sponsor the Domestic competitions and provide the kits of the Zimbabwean national cricket team.

Zimbabwe v. Bangladesh

Zimbabwe played their first Test match, after regaining their Test status, against Bangladesh at the Harare Sports Club in Harare. The only Test started on Thursday 4 August 2011. Bangladesh won the toss and elected to field first. Zimbabwe won the Test on day five by 130 runs.

See also

 Cricket in Zimbabwe
 Zimbabwe national cricket team

References

External links
brmtaylor.com
zimcricketnews.com
zimcricket.org
Zimbabwe Cricket Results
cricxpert.com

Cricket administration
Cricket administration in Zimbabwe
Sports governing bodies in Zimbabwe
Sports organizations established in 1992